Sir David Frank Adjaye  (born 22 September 1966) is a Ghanaian-British architect. He is known for having designed many notable buildings around the world, including the  National Museum of African American History and Culture in Washington, D.C. Adjaye was knighted in the 2017 New Year Honours for services to architecture. He is the recipient of the 2021 Royal Gold Medal, making him the first African recipient and one of the youngest recipients. He was appointed to the Order of Merit in 2022.

Early life and education 
Adjaye was born in Dar es Salaam, Tanzania. The son of a Ghanaian diplomat, he lived in Tanzania, Egypt, Yemen and Lebanon before moving to Britain at the age of nine. Upon graduating with a BA degree in Architecture from London South Bank University in 1990, he won the RIBA Bronze Medal for the best undergraduate design project in the UK. In 1993 he graduated from his master's programme at the Royal College of Art.

Career

In 1993, the year of his graduation, Adjaye won the RIBA Bronze Medal Award, a prize offered for RIBA Part 1 projects, normally won by students who have only completed a bachelor's degree. Previously a unit tutor at the Architectural Association, he was also a lecturer at the Royal College of Art. He was knighted in the 2017 New Year Honours for services to architecture, following an OBE in 2007. Adjaye is the recipient of the 2021 Royal Gold Medal. Given in recognition of a lifetime's work, the Royal Gold Medal is approved personally by the British monarch and given to a person or group of people who have had a significant influence 'either directly or indirectly on the advancement of architecture'.

Early projects
 
Adjaye's early works include many residential projects, including Chris Ofili's house in 1999, Dirty House and Glass House in 2002, and Lorna Simpson's studio-home in 2006. He then moved on to larger scale projects such as the Idea Store in Whitechapel, UK, and the Nobel Peace Center in Oslo, Norway, in 2005.

The studio's first solo exhibition, David Adjaye: Making Public Buildings, was shown at the Whitechapel Gallery in London in January 2006, with Thames and Hudson publishing the catalogue of the same name. This followed their 2005 publication of Adjaye's first book, David Adjaye Houses.

Other prominent early works include the Bernie Grant Arts Centre and the Stephen Lawrence Centre in 2007.

Major works

Adjaye was selected to design the Museum of Contemporary Art Denver, which opened in 2007. The building, Adjaye's first museum commission, was designed to minimize boundaries between the exterior spaces of the city and the interior galleries of the museum. Hidden skylights fill the interior spaces with natural light, and large windows look out on the city streets. The building has five galleries as well as dedicated education spaces, a shop, library and rooftop café.

Adjaye won a competition to design the Moscow School of Management Skolkovo which was completed in 2010. Rejecting the traditional campus-style, the building is designed as one form to encourage student interaction.

Adjaye designed two new neighbourhood libraries in Washington, D.C.: the Francis A. Gregory Neighborhood Library and the Bellevue / William O. Lockridge Library, which opened in 2012. The award-winning libraries are celebrated for being community beacons.

In 2015, the Aishti Foundation, a mixed art gallery and retail space, opened in Beirut, Lebanon. The gallery space is over 40,000 square feet. Adjaye's design marries art viewing with shopping, two seemingly conflicting experiences.

On 15 April 2009, Adjaye was selected lead architect for the team of architects, which includes the Freelon Group, Davis Brody Bond and SmithGroup, to design the new $540 million National Museum of African American History and Culture, a Smithsonian Institution museum, on the National Mall in Washington, D.C. His design features a crown motif from Yoruba sculpture. The museum opened in the fall of 2016 and was named "the cultural event of the year" by The New York Times. It was also the subject of a profile on the Sky Arts programme The Art of Architecture in 2019. Furniture that Adjaye designed for the museum is manufactured and sold by Knoll.

In 2007, artist Linda Pace reached out to Adjaye to design a contemporary art centre for her art collection shortly before she died from breast cancer that year. Ruby City, located in San Antonio, Texas, opened in 2019.

In 2018, 1199SEIU President George Gresham reached out to Adjaye, who later accepted the commission to design the new 16,500-square-foot member space. The designed featured hundreds of photos gathered from the union's vast photo archive and placed on ceramic tiles produced by Cerámica Suro in Guadalajara, Mexico. The 1199SEIU United Healthcare Workers East is located in New York, New York, and was completed in 2020. The designed was named Architect's Newspaper Best of Design for Interior Workplace in 2020.

In 2017, Adjaye in conjunction with HuntonBrady Architects revealed the design of the Winter Park Library and Events Center in Winter Park, Florida. The library officially opened to the public on 13 December 2021. In 2022, it was the Jury Winner in the Library Category for the Architizer A+ Awards.

Other commissions

Alongside his international commissions, Adjaye's work spans exhibitions, private homes and furniture. He built homes for the designer Alexander McQueen, artist Jake Chapman, photographer Jürgen Teller, actor Ewan McGregor, and artists Tim Noble and Sue Webster. For artist Chris Ofili, he designed a new studio and a beach house in Port of Spain, Trinidad.

Adjaye is also known for his collaborations with contemporary artists on installations and exhibitions. He worked with Ofili to create an environment for The Upper Room, which was later acquired by Tate Britain and caused a nationwide media debate. Adjaye collaborated with artist Olafur Eliasson to create a light installation, Your black horizon, at the 2005 Venice Biennale. He has also worked on the art project Sankalpa with director Shekhar Kapur. In May 2019, the Ghana Freedom Pavilion - designed by David - was inaugurated at the 58th Venice Art Biennale. He also designed the 56th Venice Art Biennale with the late curator Okwui Enwezor; the River Reading Room for the Gwangju Biennale; and the Sclera Pavilion for the London Design Festival.

Adjaye co-authored two seasons of the BBC's Dreamspaces television series and hosts a BBC radio programme. In June 2005, he presented the documentary Building Africa: Architecture of a Continent. In 2008, he participated in Manifesta 7 and the Gwangju Biennale. Making Place: The Architecture of David Adjaye was on display at the Art Institute of Chicago from September 2015 to January 2016. In November 2020, Adjaye published his early portfolio in his book titled Adjaye Works 1995–2007: Houses, Pavilions, Installations, Buildings  with Peter Allison and Thames & Hudson. In September 2022, Adjaye published his continued portfolio in his latest book titled Adjaye Works 2007 - 2015: Houses, Pavilions, Installations, Buildings  with Peter Allison and Thames & Hudson.

Recent work
In 2021, Adjaye revealed his design for the District Hospitals project across Ghana, Accra and The Africa Institute in Sharjah, UAE.

Earlier this year, the Cherry Groce Memorial Pavilion was completed. Commissioned by the Cherry Groce Foundation, the memorial is in honour of Cherry Groce, who was shot in her home by the Metropolitan Police in front of her children on 28 September 1985.

His other recent works include interiors for the SEIU 1199 Healthcare Workers' East in New York City, The Webster in Los Angeles, California (2020), Mole House in London, UK (2019), Ruby City in San Antonio, Texas (2019), McCarter Switching Station in Newark, New Jersey (2018), Sugar Hill Mixed-Use Development in Harlem, New York (2015), Alara Concept Store in Lagos, Nigeria (2015), Aïshti Foundation in Beirut, Lebanon (2015).

In 2015, Adjaye was commissioned to design a new home for the Studio Museum in Harlem.

In March 2018, Adjaye Associates' designs for the National Cathedral of Ghana were unveiled by Ghanaian president Nana Addo Dankwa Akufo-Addo.

In September 2020, Adjaye unveiled his designs for the Princeton University Art Museum. That same year, he also unveiled his designs for the Thabo Mbeki Presidential Library as well as The Martyrs Memorial in Niamey, Niger.

In November 2020, Adjaye revealed his vision for the Edo Museum of West African Art (EMOWAA) which will be built in Benin City, Nigeria. Adjaye Associates' building will house historic art and artefacts as well as incorporate galleries dedicated to contemporary arts.

His design for the Abrahamic Family House on Saadiyat Island in Abu Dhabi, UAE, is in the final stages of construction and is set to open in 2023. It is inspired by the Document on Human Fraternity and has a mosque, church, and synagogue,  celebrating the three major Abrahamic religions.  It will also include a cultural center which promotes the values of mutual respect and peaceful coexistence.

In September 2022, The W. E. B. Du Bois Museum Foundation unveiled the plans and renderings for the new W. E. B. Du Bois Museum Complex in Accra, Ghana, designed by Adjaye.

In October 2022, Grinnell College Board of Trustees approved construction of the new Civic Engagement Quad Core Project designed by Adjaye, slated to open in Fall 2024.

Firm operations
Adjaye established his practice in 2000 as Adjaye Associates. The firm now operates globally with offices in Accra, London, and New York and has completed projects in Europe, North America, the Middle East, Asia, and Africa.

Academic appointments
Adjaye was the first Louis Kahn visiting professor at the University of Pennsylvania, and was the Kenzo Tange Professor in Architecture at Harvard Graduate School of Design. In addition, he is a RIBA Chartered Member, an AIA Honorary Fellow, a Foreign Honorary Member of the American Academy of Arts and Letters, and a Senior Fellow of the Design Futures Council. He is a member of the Advisory Council of the Barcelona Institute of Architecture and also serves as member of the Advisory Boards of the Barcelona Institute of Architecture and the LSE Cities Programme.

Personal life 
He is a younger brother of stem cell scientist James Adjaye.

In 2014, Adjaye married Ashley Shaw-Scott. Chris Ofili was his best man.

Adjaye has also worked on numerous collaborative projects with his brother Peter Adjaye, a musician.

In 2018, along with Bono and Theaster Gates, Adjaye curated the third (RED) auction in Miami to support the Global Fund's work against AIDS, raising a total $10.5 million, including matching funds by the Bill & Melinda Gates Foundation.

Awards and honours 
In 2006, Adjaye was shortlisted for the Stirling Prize for the Whitechapel Idea Store, built on the remains of a 1960s mall. He was appointed Officer of the Order of the British Empire (OBE) in 2007 for services to British architecture. In 2016 he received the Massachusetts Institute of Technology's McDermott award, a $100,000 prize for excellence in the arts. That same year, he was elected to the American Philosophical Society. Adjaye was knighted in the 2017 New Year Honours for services to architecture. In 2018, Adjaye received the Washington University International Humanities Medal. In 2019, he was a member of the Prix Versailles World Judges Panel. In October 2020 Adjaye was announced as the RIBA Royal Gold Medal winner for 2021, awarded annually by the Royal Institute of British Architects on behalf of the British monarch, in recognition of an individual's or group's substantial contribution to international architecture.

RIBA Bronze Medal for Architecture Students - 1990
 Design Futures Council Senior Fellow
 Design Miami/ Designer of the Year Award - 2011
 Powerlist: Britain's Most Influential Black Person - 2012
 Eugene McDermott Award in the Arts at MIT - 2016 
 Time magazine's 100 Most Influential People - 2017
 Ghana Legacy Honors Impact in Architecture Award
 AJ100 Contribution to the Profession Award - 2018
 Thomas Jefferson Memorial Award - 2018
 Louis I. Khan Memorial Award - 2018
 Isamu Noguchi Award from the Noguchi Museum. - 2020
 RIBA Royal Gold Medal - 2021 
Crystal Award - 2021
Charlotte Perriand Award - 2022
TIME100 Impact Award - 2022
Order of Merit - 2022.

References

Further reading 
 Alexandra Lange, "Don't Call David Adjaye a Starchitect" (interview), New York, 15 July 2007
 Icon interview (2005)
 BBC Radio 3 interview
 Whitechapel exhibition (2006)
 Whitechapel exhibition review
 Hugh Pearman, "David Adjaye meets Alfred Nobel in Oslo: architecture for peace". First published in The Sunday Times, London, 24 July 2005 as "Chamber of secrets".
 Tom Dyckhoff, "Behind The Facade", The Guardian, 8 February 2003.
 David Adjaye speaking at Design Indaba

External links 
 

1966 births
Living people
21st-century British architects
Academics of the Royal College of Art
Alumni of London South Bank University
Alumni of the Royal College of Art
Black British academics
Black British people
BRIT Award trophy designers
British expatriate academics in the United States
British people of Ghanaian descent
Ghanaian architects
Harvard Graduate School of Design faculty
Honorary Fellows of the American Institute of Architects
Knights Bachelor
Members of the American Philosophical Society
Members of the Order of Merit
Naturalised citizens of the United Kingdom
Officers of the Order of the British Empire
People from Dar es Salaam
Princeton University faculty
Royal Academicians
Tanzanian emigrants to the United Kingdom
University of Pennsylvania faculty